Eshkoftuiyeh (also Romanized as Eshkoftū’īyeh) is a village in Hanza Rural District, Hanza District, Rabor County, Kerman Province, Iran. At the 2006 census, its population was 27, in 6 families.

References 

Populated places in Rabor County